Chitobioses are a group of related disaccharides of β-1,4-linked glucosamine units. The term chitobiose is sometimes used to refer to different members of the group, depending on the method by which it was first isolated, resulting in some ambiguity as to which chemical compound the name is referring to.

Chitobiose is the condensed form of 4‐O‐(2‐amino‐2‐deoxy‐β‐D‐glucopyranosyl)‐2‐amino‐2‐deoxy‐D‐glucose and is an acetylation disaccharide found in chitin. It is formed by the depolymerization of chitin either enzymatically or chemically.  

Chitobiose is utilized by Borrelia burgdorferi to produce N-acetylglucosamine, a component of the bacterial cell wall, and is regularized by the response regulator rrp1. A mutant strain of rrp1 has been found to cause growth deficits with Borrelia burgdorferi. 

In Escherichia coli, the chb operon is involved with the utilization of cellobiose and β-glucosides chitobiose. The chbG gene of the chb Operon encodes a chitooligosaccharide deacetylase. The chb operon is also responsible for coding the ChbR regulator, which is responsible for activating transcription when chitobiose is available.

See also 
 Glucosamine
 Lysozyme

References 

Amino sugars
Disaccharides